Samuel Calmin Kohs (June 2, 1890 – January 23, 1984) was an American psychologist who spent his career in clinical and educational psychology. He was awarded a B.A. degree at City College of New York, an M.A. at Clark University. He developed, for his doctoral dissertation in 1919 at Stanford University, a set of small variously colored blocks (known as the Kohs blocks) that are used to form test patterns in psycho-diagnostic examination.

Kohs was an active member of the Jewish community in the U.S. He served as field secretary of the Western States division of the National Jewish Welfare Board from 1941 to 1956, as executive director of the Oakland Jewish Welfare Federation in California and of the Brooklyn Federation of Jewish Charities, and as Chairman of the Department of Social Technology at the Graduate School of Jewish Social Work in Manhattan. He died at age 93 in San Francisco, and was survived by his son Ellis.

Selected works

References

Further reading

20th-century American psychologists
American Jews
1890 births
1984 deaths
People from New York (state)